Harold Turner Harcourt (5 July 1896 – 17 December 1970) was a Canadian rower. He competed in the men's coxed four event at the 1920 Summer Olympics.

References

External links
 

1896 births
1970 deaths
Canadian male rowers
Olympic rowers of Canada
Rowers at the 1920 Summer Olympics
Rowers from Toronto
20th-century Canadian people